Rima Kashafutdinova (born 24 July 1995) is a Kazakhstani sprinter. She competed in the women's 100 metres and 4 × 100 metres relay event at the 2016 Summer Olympics. She, Olga Safronova, Viktoriya Zyabkina and Merjen Ishanguliyeva were the winning 100m relay team who took the gold medals at the 2017 Asian Athletics Championships in Bhubaneswar.

References

External links
 

1995 births
Living people
Kazakhstani female sprinters
People from Karaganda Region
Athletes (track and field) at the 2016 Summer Olympics
Athletes (track and field) at the 2018 Asian Games
Olympic athletes of Kazakhstan
Asian Games medalists in athletics (track and field)
Asian Games bronze medalists for Kazakhstan
Medalists at the 2018 Asian Games
Olympic female sprinters
21st-century Kazakhstani women